Ralphsnyder Decagonal Barn is a historic decagonal shaped barn located near Masontown, Preston County, West Virginia. The 10-sided barn was built in 1890, and is a frame building with an unusual steeple-shaped cupola.  The barn was moved to its present site in 1981, which necessitated a number of replacements of portions of the original structure and roof. It is the only 10-sided barn known to have been constructed in West Virginia.

It was listed on the National Register of Historic Places in 1985.

References

Polygonal barns in the United States
Barns on the National Register of Historic Places in West Virginia
Infrastructure completed in 1890
Buildings and structures in Preston County, West Virginia
National Register of Historic Places in Preston County, West Virginia
Barns in West Virginia
Decagonal buildings